Nahj al-Balagha ('The Path of Eloquence') is the best-known collection of sermons, letters, and sayings attributed to Ali ibn Abi Talib, fourth Rashidun Caliph, first Shia Imam and the cousin and son-in-law of the Islamic prophet, Muhammad. It was collected by al-Sharif al-Radi, a renowned Shia scholar in the tenth century AD (fourth century AH). Known for its moral aphorisms and eloquent content, Nahj al-Balagha is widely studied in the Islamic world and has considerably influenced the field of Arabic literature and rhetoric. Ibn Abil-Hadid, the author of an in-depth commentary on the book, believes that Nahj al-Balagha is "above the words of men and below the words of God." The authenticity of Nahj al-Balagha has long been the subject of lively polemic debates, though recent scholarship suggests that most of the content can indeed be attributed to Ali.

Overview 
Nahj al-Balagha is a collection of more than 200 sermons, nearly 80 letters, and almost 500 sayings.

The sermons and letters in Nahj al-Balagha offer a commentary on Ali's political career and have served as an ideological basis for Islamic governance. Notably, Ali's letter of instructions to the governor of Egypt has been viewed as a model of just Islamic governance, "where justice and mercy is shown to human beings irrespective of class, creed and color, where poverty is neither a stigma or disqualification and where justice is not tarred with nepotism, favoritism, provincialism or religious fanaticism." In particular, Nahj al-Balagha includes an in-depth discussion of social responsibilities, emphasizing that greater responsibilities result in greater rights. Nahj al-Balagha also contains more sensitive material, including criticism of Ali's predecessors in its Shaqshaqiya Sermon, and disapproval of Talha and Zubayr, who took up arms against Ali in the Battle of the Camel. Nahj al-Balagha remains at the heart of the ongoing clerical debate about the role and status of women in modern societies.

Nahj al-Balagha also contains passages about morality and doctrine, notably about the sovereignty of God and the significance of the Quran and Muhammad. The letter of life advices, addressed to Ali's eldest son, Hasan, has received considerable attention.

Nahj al-Balagha has been the focus of numerous commentaries, translations, and studies by both Sunni and Shia scholars. The commentary written by the Mu'tazila scholar Ibn Abil-Hadid remains the most important. With its eight volumes, this commentary has amplified the influence of Nahj al-Balagha on theological speculation, philosophical thought, and literally scope, according to Shah-Kazemi.

Authenticity 
The compilation of Nahj al-Balagha is often credited to al-Sharif al-Razi, a renowned tenth-century Shia scholar, over three hundred years after Ali. In view of its sometimes sensitive content, the attribution of this book to Ali or al-Sharif has long been the subject of Sunni-Shia debates, as with the majority of the works about Shia theology. Ibn Khallikan might have been the first to question the authenticity of the book in the thirteenth century and his view has been echoed by most Sunni authors to date. On the other hand, the Mu'tazila scholar Ibn Abil-Hadid, who authored a major commentary on Nahj al-Balagha, has no doubts that it is the work of Ali and compiled by al-Sharif.

Nahj al-Balagha is regarded by the Shia as authentic. According to the Shia scholar Motahhari, in compiling the book, al-Sharif was primarily interested in the literary value of Ali's inheritance. As a result, Motahhari continues, al-Sharif preserved those passages which he found literary valuable and paid little attention to recording his sources. After al-Sharif, other scholars took up the task of collecting the chains of transmission (isnads) for Nahj al-Balagha. For instance, Muhammad Baqir al-Mahmudi collected all of Ali's extant speeches, sermons, decrees, epistles, prayers, and sayings. Motahhari adds that this collection includes the content of Nahj al-balagha and other discourses which were not incorporated by al-Sharif or were not available to him. According to Motahhari, except for some aphorisms, the contents of Nahj al-Balaghah have over time been traced back to Ali.

In support of Ali's authorship, some of the material in Nahj al-Balagha is also listed in al-Fihrist or can be found in earlier works attributed to Ali. More recently, Veccia Vaglieri verified that a large portion of Nahj al-Balagha can indeed be attributed to Ali, although it was difficult to gauge the authenticity of the more apocryphal sections. Djebli has been able to identify a considerable number of passages, accompanied by chains of transmission dating back to the time of Ali, which were recounted by ancient scholars, such as al-Tabari. In his book, Modarressi, an expert in Islamic law, refers to Madarek-e Nahj al-Balagha by the Shia scholar Ostadi which, in turn, links Nahj al-Balagha to Ali. Another notable work was done by the Indian Sunni scholar Imtiyaz Ali Arshi, who succeeded in tracing back the early sources of 106 sermons, 37 letters and 79 dispersed sayings of Ali in his book Istinad-e Nahj al-balaghah, originally written in Urdu, subsequently translated into Arabic in 1957, then into English and Persian.

Nahj al-Balagha was most likely compiled by al-Sharif, who also referred to it in his later works. There is also strong circumstantial evidence that al-Sharif was compiling pieces from earlier sources as he came across them rather than composing them himself. It has been noted that al-Sharif's writing style is different from that of Ali. In particular, Ibn Abil-Hadid reports the following exchange between his teacher, al-Wasiti, and al-Wasiti's teacher, Ibn Khashab:

Computational Verification

Sarwar and Mohamed (2021) used computational methods, mainly stylometric analysis and machine learning, to examine the authenticity of Nahj Al-Balagha. They compared the texts in the book against those by Sharif Radhi and Sharif Murtadha and concluded that the book is internally consistent, which indicates that it can be attributed to a single author, the book was not authored by Sharif Radhi, and the book was not authored by Sharif Myrtadha. These conclusions indicate that the book content was most probably produced by Imam Ali.

Sermons 
The English translation of Nahj al Balagha by Ali Reza includes more than 200 sermons attributed to Ali, listed below after minor edits.

Letters 
The English translation of Nahj al Balagha by Ali Reza includes nearly 80 letters authored by Ali, listed below after minor edits.

Sayings 
The English translation of Nahj al Balagha by Ali Reza includes almost 500 sayings attributed to Ali, a few of which are summarized below.

Translations 
Nahj al-Balagha has been translated from Arabic to many languages. A few of these translations are listed below:

See also 

 Al-Jafr 
 Letter of Ali ibn Abi Talib to Malik al-Ashtar
 Al-Jamia
 Al-Sahifa al-Sajjadiyya
 Book of Fatimah
 Ghurar al-Hikam wa Durar al-Kalim
 List of Shia books
 Sharif Razi
Mulla Sadra
Khutbah

References

Sources

External links 

 Nahjul Balagha (English)
 Nahj ul-Balagha (English)
 Nahj al-Balagha (English)
 Nahj al-Balaghah (English)
Nahj al-Balagha (English)
Nahj al-Balagha (English)
Nahj al-Balagha Audio (English)
Nahj al-Balagha Google Chrome Quotes Extension (English)
Freedom, Human Destiny, and the World in the Nahj al-Balaghah
 Lineage of al-Radi and his Life
 Sources of Nahj al-Balaghah
 Misconceptions about Nahj al-Balaghah
 Right to Acquire Knowledge: Nahj al-Balaghah's Approach
The Concept of Freedom in the Nahj al-Balaghah
 Freedom in the Islamic Framework of Human Rights, With Special Reference to the Nahj al-Balaghah

Works about Ali
Medieval Arabic literature
Shia hadith collections
Islamic sermons
Islamic texts
Shia literature
10th-century Arabic books
Islamic philosophical texts
Philosophy of life